...undone was released in 1985 in the UK and the U.S. on A&M Records. It was The Lucy Show's debut album. The band's sound at that time was brooding and melancholic, heavily influenced by—and favorably compared to – The Cure, Comsat Angels, and Joy Division. The album contains what are generally considered The Lucy Show's two best songs, "Ephemeral (This is no Heaven)" and "Undone". Although it sold reasonably well in the United States, topping the CMJ charts there, the band was dropped by A&M UK at the end of the year, sending them in search of a new label. In 2009, ...undone was released on CD for the first time by the Words on Music label.

Track listing

Personnel
The Lucy Show consisted of:
 Mark Bandola – vocals, guitar, keyboards
 Rob Vandeven – vocals, bass guitar
 Pete Barraclough – guitars, keyboards
 Bryan Hudspeth – drums

with:

 Fiona Stephen – violin on "Better on the Hard Side", "The White Space", and "Resistance"

References 

The Lucy Show (band) albums
1985 debut albums
A&M Records albums